Euryops pectinatus, the grey-leaved euryops, is a species of flowering plant in the family Asteraceae, endemic to rocky, sandstone slopes in the Western Cape of South Africa (from Gifberg to the Cape Peninsula).

Description

They bloom from early summer through to autumn and into winter in areas with mild climates.

The fruits bear a single seed and are either hairless or covered in myxogenic (slime-producing) hairs, and may also be topped by a pappus of white or brown bristles.

The Latin specific epithet pectinatus means “comb-like”, possibly referring to the deeply-divided, fernlike leaves.

Cultivation
Euryops pectinatus is widely used as a garden plant, especially in urban areas and due to its almost perpetual flowering regime. It grows best in full sun and well-drained deep soils. It must be grown in a sheltered location, away from frost-prone areas. It has gained the Royal Horticultural Society's Award of Garden Merit.

All parts of the plant are poisonous if ingested.

References

External links

pectinatus
Flora of South Africa